Juan Valdez (born November 24, 1983) is an Aruban football player. He has played for Aruba national team.

National team statistics

References

1983 births
Living people
Aruban footballers
Place of birth missing (living people)
Association football defenders
SV Britannia players
SV Racing Club Aruba players
SV Dakota players
Aruba international footballers